The Salloomt River is a river in the Bella Coola Valley of the Central Coast region of British Columbia, Canada.  It is a tributary of the Bella Coola River, flowing southwest out of the southernmost Kitimat Ranges to meet that river just upstream from the community of Hagensborg.

See also
List of rivers of British Columbia

References

Bella Coola Valley
Rivers of the Kitimat Ranges
Rivers of the Central Coast of British Columbia
Range 3 Coast Land District